William James Craig (11 September 1929 – 31 August 2011) was a Scottish footballer who played as a wing half in the Football League.

References

External links

1929 births
2011 deaths
Scottish footballers
Footballers from Aberdeen
Dundee F.C. players
Millwall F.C. players
English Football League players
Scottish Football League players
Association football wing halves